Majendra Narzary (15 May 1953 – 26 May 2021) was a Bodoland People's Front politician from Assam.

Biography
He was elected in Assam Legislative Assembly election from 2006 from Gossaigaon constituency.

References 

1953 births
2021 deaths
Bodoland People's Front politicians
People from Kokrajhar district
Assam MLAs 2006–2011
Assam MLAs 2011–2016
Assam MLAs 2016–2021
Assam MLAs 2021–2026
Deaths from the COVID-19 pandemic in India